Mary Dutch is an American wheelchair curler.

Teams

References

External links 

Living people
1944 births
American male curlers
American wheelchair curlers